Dudley Lake may refer to:

 Dudley Lake (Rice County, Minnesota)
 Dudley Lake (Teton County, Wyoming)